The European Union does not set public holidays for its member states. However the European Commission does set public holidays for the employees of the institutions of the European Union.

The holidays will typically cover the following dates of significance and movable feasts:

This list includes all ten public holidays in Belgium, except for Armistice Day (11 November). For Luxembourg, Belgian National Day is replaced by the Luxembourgish National Day.

See also
 Work–life balance in the European Union

For information on public holidays in individual EU member states see below:

 Austria
 Belgium
 Bulgaria
 Croatia
 Cyprus
 Czech Republic
 Denmark
 Estonia
 Finland
 France
 Germany
 Greece
 Hungary
 Ireland
 Italy
 Latvia
 Lithuania
 Luxembourg
 Malta
 Netherlands
 Poland
 Portugal
 Romania
 Slovakia
 Slovenia
 Spain
 Sweden

References

European Union
European Union
European Union